Jadyr Egídio de Souza (9 April 1930 – 13 August 1977), known as Jadir or Jadyr, was a Brazilian professional footballer who played as a defender. He played most of his career at Flamengo, where he is one of the most capped players in the club's history.

Career 
Jadir is bet known for his time spent at Flamengo, playing alongside Dequinha and Jordan in the defense that captured three consecutive Campeonato Carioca titles - 1953-54-55. In total he played in 472 games for Flamengo (270 wins, 91 draws, 101 losses) and scored five goals. Jadir has the 9th most appearances by a player in Flamengo history.

In 1962 after leaving Flamengo, he appeared in a single game for Cruzeiro and later moved to Botafogo, winning the Campeonato Carioca again that year. Some sources indicate he played briefly for Spain's Mallorca before retiring.

For the Brazilian National Team, Jadir appeared in six matches (two against Portugal, two against Argentina, one against Bulgaria and one against Paraguay) earning five wins and one defeat.

Titles 
Flamengo

 Torneio Início do Campeonato Carioca: 1952
 Campeonato Carioca: 1953, 1954, 1955
 Torneio Rio-São Paulo: 1961
 Torneio Octogonal de Verão do Uruguai: 1961
 Troféu Magalhães Pinto: 1961

Botafogo

 Campeonato Carioca: 1962

See also 

 List of Clube de Regatas do Flamengo players

References 

1930 births
1977 deaths
Brazilian footballers
Association football defenders
Brazil international footballers
CR Flamengo footballers
Cruzeiro Esporte Clube players
Botafogo de Futebol e Regatas players
Footballers from Rio de Janeiro (city)